The International Association of Engineers (IAENG) is a non-profit international association for engineers and computer scientists. IAENG was founded by a group of engineers and computer scientists in 1968, originally as a private club network for its founding members. Nowadays, IAENG has its secretariat office in Hong Kong with more than 140,000 members (May 2014) and holds the annual congress World Congress on Engineering  for the engineering research communities.

The association is a promoter of the open-access publications. All of its current publications  have adopted the open-access policy, including its popular title Engineering Letters. The association also cooperates with publishers like Springer, American Institute of Physics and World Scientific Publishing etc. to publish the book series IAENG Transactions on Engineering Technologies.

External links
 International Association of Engineers About IAENG Home Page
 WorldCat Records of World Congress on Engineering
 SCIMago Journal & Country Rank IAENG International Journal of Computer Science
 SCIMago Journal & Country Rank IAENG International Journal of Applied Mathematics
 DOAJ Content Lecture Notes in Engineering and Computer Science 
 DOAJ Content Engineering Letters 
 Springer publishing IAENG books
 AIP Scitation of IAENG books
 World Scientific Publishing IAENG books

References

 
Engineering societies